Greenfield Opera House Building, also known as Greenfield Opry House, is a historic opera house building located at Greenfield, Dade County, Missouri. It was built in 1887–1888, and is a three-story, rectangular, Late Victorian style red brick building.  It measures 67 feet by 84 feet and features a pressed metal and cast iron ornamented facade.  It has three storefronts on the first floor and opera house on the second and part of the third floors.

It was listed on the National Register of Historic Places in 1998.

References

External links

"The Greenfield Opera House won’t be a tragedy for much longer. Instead, it’ll begin its happy ending," Ozarks Alive, July 2015

Theatres on the National Register of Historic Places in Missouri
Victorian architecture in Missouri
Theatres completed in 1888
Buildings and structures in Dade County, Missouri
National Register of Historic Places in Dade County, Missouri